Matthew Collins (born May 22, 1967) is an American lightweight rower. He won a gold medal at the 1993 World Rowing Championships in Račice with the lightweight men's four.

References

1967 births
Living people
American male rowers
World Rowing Championships medalists for the United States